The Saunders-Crosby House, at 200 E. Deming in Roswell, New Mexico, was built in 1905.  It was listed on the National Register of Historic Places in 1985.

It is unusual in its Queen Anne style because it has a two-story hexagonal cupola and a hexagonal porch and cupola.  All eaves have Victorian gingerbread trim.

It was purchased in 1907 as part of recruiting H.P. Saunders, a banker, to move from Dallas, Texas.  Mrs. Ruby Saunders Crosby, a daughter who served in the Red Cross overseas during World War I, donated the house to the American National Red Cross in 1965.  The Red Cross owned it in 1985.

References

External links

National Register of Historic Places in Chaves County, New Mexico
Queen Anne architecture in New Mexico
Houses completed in 1905
1905 establishments in New Mexico Territory
Houses on the National Register of Historic Places in New Mexico